Dušan Mitević (3 February 1938 – 31 May 2003) was a Serbian journalist.

From 1989–91 he was director of Radio Television Belgrade (RTB, later renamed Radio Television of Serbia in 1992), Serbia's public broadcaster, during the breakup of Yugoslavia and the ascent to power of Slobodan Milošević. He resigned from the post following the violent March 1991 Belgrade protests which had been organized by opposition parties against the increasingly propagandist content of state-controlled media.

Mitević made a statement about the nature of state media in Serbia under Milošević's guidance: "The things that happened at state TV: warmongering, things we can admit to now: false information, biased reporting.  That went directly from Milošević to the head of TV".

References

1938 births
2003 deaths
People from Pljevlja
Serbs of Montenegro
Serbian journalists
20th-century journalists